The foreign relations of Third Reich were characterized by the territorial expansionist ambitions of Germany's dictator Adolf Hitler and the promotion of the ideologies of anti-communism and antisemitism within Germany and its conquered territories. The Nazi regime oversaw Germany's rise as a militarist world power from the state of humiliation and disempowerment it had experienced following its defeat in World War I. From the late 1930s to its defeat in 1945, Germany was the most formidable of the Axis powers - a military alliance between Imperial Japan, Fascist Italy, and their allies and puppet states.

History 
Following the Treaty of Versailles in 1919, Germany succumbed to a considerably weakened position in pan-European politics, losing its colonial possessions and its military assets, and committed to reparations to the Allied Powers. These concessions to the Allied Powers led to a great feeling of disillusionment within the newly established Weimar Republic which paved the way for the Nazi party, under the leadership of Adolf Hitler to seize power. Upon Hitler's taking power in January 1933, Germany began a program of industrialization and rearmament. It re-occupied the Rhineland and sought to dominate neighboring countries with significant German populations.

World War II

Germany's foreign policy during the war involved the creation of friendly governments under direct or indirect control from Berlin. A main goal was obtaining soldiers from the senior allies, such as Italy and Hungary, and millions of workers and ample food supplies from subservient allies such as Vichy France. By the fall of 1942, there were 24 divisions from Romania on the Eastern Front, 10 from Italy and 10 from Hungary. When a country was no longer dependable, Germany would assume full control, as it did with France in 1942, Italy in 1943, and Hungary in 1944. Full control allowed the Nazis to achieve their high priority of mass murdering all Jewish population. Although Japan was officially a powerful ally, the relationship was distant and there was little coordination or cooperation, such as Germany's refusal to share the secret formula for making synthetic oil from coal until late in the war.

DiNardo argues that in Europe Germany's foreign-policy was dysfunctional during the war, as Hitler treated each ally separately, and refused to create any sort of combined staff that would synchronize policies, armaments, and strategies. Italy, Finland, Romania, and Hungary each dealt with Berlin separately, and never coordinated their activities. Germany was reluctant to share its powerful weapons systems, or to train Axis officers. There were some exceptions, such as the close collaboration between the German and Italian forces in North Africa.

Hitler devoted most of his attention during the war to military and diplomatic affairs. He frequently met with foreign leaders, such as the January 10, 1943, he met with Romanian Premier Marshal Ion Antonescu at German field headquarters, with top-ranking generals on both sides. On 9 August 1943, Hitler summoned Tsar Boris III of Bulgaria to a stormy meeting at field headquarters, and demanded he declare war on Russia. The tsar refused, but did agree to declare war on far-away Britain. American news reports stated that Hitler tried to hit him and the tsar suffered a heart attack at the meeting; he died three weeks later.

Relations with the Axis powers

Italy

Japan

Finland

Relations with the Allied powers 

Nazi Germany financed and supported political organizations that opposed the hostile policies of the United Kingdom, United States and France.

Relations with the Soviet Union 

Nazi foreign relations with the Soviet Union can be characterized at the beginning of World War II as being relatively friendly. Even though Nazi Germany hated Communism and thus the Soviet Union and vice versa, both countries were able to form a tenuous non-aggression pact. On August 23, 1939, the Nazi and Communist regimes signed the Molotov-Ribbentrop non-aggression pact that publicly stated that the two countries would not go to war. However, behind closed doors, the two countries had agreed to a secret plan, one that was not publicly stated. In this hidden agenda, the Nazi’s and the Soviet Union carved Poland, Lithuania, Estonia, Finland, and Bessarabia into spheres of influence. For the Soviet Union, it would receive the eastern portion of Poland and the countries Latvia, Estonia, Finland, and Bessarabia. For the Nazis, it would obtain the Western portion of Poland and the country of Lithuania.

After the German invasion and subsequent annexation of Poland, Russian and German ties began to degrade. Trouble began to brew in 1940 when a meeting between Ribbentrop and Molotov over a potential Soviet-Nazi alliance with Italy and Japan fell apart, and both countries came away from the meeting empty-handed. This non-aggression pact and friendly relations lasted until June 21, 1941, when Germany began to line the Polish-Russian border with military troops. These German troops were seen deconstructing barricades and cutting barbed wire on the border in preparation for a land invasion of the Soviet Union. After multiple attempts by the Russian embassy in Berlin to communicate with German officials, it was foreseen by Joseph Stalin that a German attack on the Soviet Union was imminent. To combat this, Stalin decided to line the Russian side of the border with border guards to defend the motherland. Finally, Soviet ambassadors Vladimir Dekanozov and Valentin Berezhkov, who were stationed in Berlin, were alerted by German minister Joachim von Ribbentrop on June 21, 1941, that Nazi Germany was beginning its assault on the Soviet homeland. On the following day, June 22, 1941, Nazi Germany formally declared war on the Soviet Union and began Operation Barbarossa. With the start of Operation Barbarossa, all friendly Nazi-Soviet relations ceased and war between the two countries waged until 1945.

Relations with neutral countries 
Despite its pan-Germanic expansionism, the Nazi regime did not invade Switzerland or Sweden.

Ireland

Spain 
In the early part of World War II, Germany's foreign relations with Spain heavily revolved around propaganda efforts. These efforts were geared mainly at having Spain enter the war on the side of the axis powers. Spain had close ties with Nazi Germany since it gave aid both militarily and financially in the Spanish Civil war that occurred four years before World War II that installed Francisco Franco as an autocrat of Spain. Germany facilitated this rise of Franco due to its lust for Spanish economic institutions and mineral mines, which would be necessary for a pre-war military buildup; a strategic move in foreign relations that allowed Germany to both have a close European ally and an established industrial center. With Germany engaged in a Europe wide military conflict, it looked to Spain to become a close military ally of the Reich. To make this goal a reality, Nazi Germany sent Hans Josef Lazar to Spain to head the country's pro-Nazi regime propaganda efforts. As the war progressed, Germany started to shift its aims of recruiting Spain to become one of the Axis powers to have it as a neutral power that could supply Germany with the resources it needed to fuel its militaristic ambitions. In February of 1942, Spain and Germany signed the Spanish-German Secret Protocol, which solidified this new stance of Spanish neutrality between the two countries. With this latest secret protocol in place, Lazar began gearing Nazi propaganda towards supporting the Franco regime to create political stability within Spain and solidify Nazi ties to the Spanish leadership to ensure the continued support of the German war effort. Lazar was instructed by Berlin to portray critical messages in Nazi propaganda during the war, the first being that Germany had the right to wage war due to the allies blaming Germany solely for the cause of World War I and secondly, portraying Great Britain in a negative light.

In January 1942, with a sharp increase in Allied propaganda being funneled into Spain, the German government proposed the Große plan, which aimed at taking this allied propaganda and misconstruing it to portray pro-Nazi messages. The Große plan was mostly successful until 1944. When Germany started to falter in its war performance, Spanish news agencies began to print less and less pro-German propaganda within their publications. This downward trend of printing pro-Nazi propaganda would continue to the end of World War II, making the Große Plan an inadequate long-term solution for German Propaganda efforts. 

Even though print propaganda in Spain was not employed very much after 1944, Germany's other objective for Spain was influencing pro-German sentiment in other countries. To do this, Germany undertook the construction of radio towers within Spain that could transmit to other countries in hopes of fostering pro-Nazi sentiment. These radio stations attempted to support the Nazis covertly, but it did not take long for observers to uncover the German bias in its messaging. In sum, however, these radio stations were useful in disseminating German propaganda in the Americas, but in the Americas listeners were not perceptive to this pro-Nazi propaganda.

Regional relations

Americas
The Third Reich considered Americas to belong to the sphere of influence of the United States. During the Second World War, Nazi Germany's central foreign policy towards American countries was to maintain neutrality.

Middle East 

Nazi German government representatives cultivated ties with the Muslim religious leaders in the early 1940s, such as Hajj Amin al-Husseini, the Grand Mufti of Jerusalem. Hardline Muslim clerics such as al-Husseini endorsed Nazi Germany's anti-Jewish agenda and pogroms, and actively sought to recruit the Muslims of Bosnia and Eastern Europe for Nazi German military forces. Reza Shah Pahlavi, the first Shah of Iran of Pahlavi Dynasty harbored pro-Nazi sympathies, but Nazi Germany was unable to prevent Britain and Soviet Russia from taking control of his regime and forcing him to abdicate in favor of his oldest son, Mohammad Reza Shah Pahlavi, in 1941.

India 

As part of their campaign to weaken the British Empire, Nazi Germany expressed support for hardline Indian revolutionaries seeking India's independence. Although the Indian National Congress and other Indian political organizations opposed Nazi Germany or preserved neutrality, revolutionaries under Subhas Chandra Bose openly sought Germany's backing. Bose escaped from prison to deliver a speech from Berlin. With German and Japanese backing, Bose formed the Provisional Government of Free India and the Indian National Army to fight British forces occupying India. As a result, India allowed the continuation of the war.

Goals 

Hitler's speeches sometimes did mention return of the lost African colonies, as a bargaining point, but at all times his real target was Eastern Europe.

See also 
 Axis Powers
 Lebensraum

References

Further reading
 DiNardo, Richard L. "The dysfunctional coalition: The Axis Powers and the Eastern Front in World War II", The Journal of Military History (1996) 60#4 pp 711–730
 DiNardo, Richard L. Germany and the Axis Powers: From Coalition to Collapse (2005) excerpt and text search
 Evans, Richard J. The Third Reich at War (2010), a comprehensive history  excerpt and text search
 Gigliotti, Simone. and Hilary Earl, eds. A Companion to the Holocaust (John Wiley & Sons, 2020).
 Gilbert, Martin. The Routledge Atlas of the Holocaust (3rd ed. 2004). online
 Gilbert, Martin.  The Holocaust: A History of the Jews of Europe During the Second World War (1985) online
 Goda, Norman J. W. "The diplomacy of the Axis, 1940–1945" in The Cambridge History of The Second World War: vol. 2 (2015) pp 275– 300. 
 Kertesz, Stephen D. Diplomacy in a Whirlpool: Hungary Between Nazi Germany and Soviet Russia (U of Notre Dame Press, 1953).
 Kershaw, Ian. Hitler: 1936–1945 Nemesis (2001), 1168pp;  excerpt and text search
 Knox, MacGregor. Hitler's Italian Allies: Royal Armed Forces, Fascist Regime, and the War of 1940–1943 (2000) online
 Leitz, Christian. Nazi Foreign Policy, 1933–1941: The Road to Global War (2004) 201pp
 Mallett, Robert. Mussolini and the Origins of the Second World War, 1933–1940 (2003) excerpt and text search
 Martin, Bernd. Japan and Germany in the Modern World (1995)
 Mazower, Mark. Hitler's Empire: How the Nazis Ruled Europe (2009) excerpt and text search
 Mazower, Mark. Inside Hitler's Greece: The Experience of Occupation, 1941–44 (2001).
 Michalka, Wolfgang. "Conflicts Within the German Leadership on the Objectives and Tactics of German Foreign Policy, 1933-9." in The Fascist Challenge and the Policy of Appeasement (Routledge, 2021) pp. 48-60.

 Nekrich, Aleksandr Moiseevich. Pariahs, Partners, Predators: German-Soviet relations, 1922-1941 (Columbia University Press, 1997).
 Noakes, Jeremy and Geoffrey Pridham, eds. Nazism 1919–1945, vol. 3: Foreign Policy, War and Racial Extermination (1991), primary sources.
 Rich, Norman. Hitler's War Aims: Ideology, the Nazi State, and the Course of Expansion Vol. 1. (WW Norton1992).
 Rich, Norman. Hitler's War Aims: Vol. II, The Establishment of the New Order (WW Norton and Co., 1974).

 Tooze, Adam. The Wages of Destruction: The Making and Breaking of the Nazi Economy (2008), 848pp  excerpt and text search
 Toynbee, Arnold, ed. Survey Of International Affairs: Hitler's Europe 1939–1946  (1954)  online; 760pp; Highly detailed coverage of Germany, Italy and conquered territories.
 Weinberg, Gerhard L. Hitler's Foreign Policy 1933–1939: The Road to World War II (2005)
 Wright, Jonathan. Germany and the Origins of the Second World War (2007) 223pp

 
History of the foreign relations of Germany